George Finch-Hatton  may refer to:
George Finch-Hatton (MP for Rochester) (1747–1823), English politician, MP for Rochester
George Finch-Hatton, 10th Earl of Winchilsea (1791–1858), English politician and peer
George Finch-Hatton, 11th Earl of Winchilsea (1815–1887), British politician and peer

See also
George Finch (disambiguation)
George Hatton, MP for Lisburn (UK Parliament constituency)